The Happiness of Others is a Canadian comedy-drama film, directed by Jean-Philippe Pearson and released in 2011. The film centres on Jean-Pierre (Michel Barrette), a middle-aged man whose marriage to Louise (Louise Portal) broke up 20 years earlier, as he announces to Louise and their now-adult children Sylvain (Marc-André Grondin) and Marion (Ève Duranceau) that his new girlfriend Évelyne (Julie Le Breton) is pregnant.

The cast also includes Germain Houde, Stéphane Breton, Isabelle Vincent and Normand Daneau in supporting roles.

The film was shot in Montreal in 2010, and premiered on October 7, 2011.

Critical response
Brendan Kelly of the Montreal Gazette rated the film just one star out of five, writing that "Le bonheur des autres should be a much better film than it is. There is the germ of a great idea lurking somewhere deep inside the first feature written and directed by Jean-Philippe Pearson but that good idea is smothered by a screenplay that's terminally flawed...First off, any movie that wastes the talent of someone as gifted as Marc-André Grondin has much to answer for. He plays Jean-Pierre's son Sylvain, and it's at Sylvain's 29th birthday dinner that his dad announces that he's set to have another kid. Sylvain's girlfriend dumps him in brutal fashion right at the start of the film, and that is about all that happens to him in the story. Much less convincing is the main couple, Jean-Pierre and Evelyne. How can I put this politely? Oh well, forget politeness. Jean-Pierre is such a jerk you don't for a minute believe someone as beautiful, smart and poised as Evelyne would spend a night with him, let alone form a family with him. Le Breton is pretty good - as always - but it just had me dreaming of the day this fine actress finally nabs the meaty big-screen role she deserves."

Elizabeth Lepage-Boily Cinoche.com has an other point of View about the movie "Le scénario du premier film de Jean-Philippe Pearson est certes intrigant et sympathique, mais la véritable force de l'oeuvre se trouve davantage au niveau de sa structure narrative que dans le sujet exploité. Une famille dysfonctionnelle n'est pas le thème le plus original qui soit, mais la manière qu'a le réalisateur de décrire chacun de ses personnages, de nous amener à les aimer malgré leurs défauts flagrants et leurs erreurs parfois impardonnables, nous fait apprécier son film instinctivement... Pearson réussit à créer une union solide, des rapprochements importants (malgré la discorde qui règne entre eux) entre les différentes cellules pour que nous nous attachions aux protagonistes sans perdre de vu les filons de l'histoire. Ce qui est remarquable également c'est le côté très observateur du récit. Jamais le scénariste ne porte un jugement sur les actions de ses héros, personne ne détient la vérité et le public est libre de choisir son camp sans se sentir guidé ou influencé par une moralité, une conscience imposée. Nous serions tentés de juger Jean-Pierre qui a quitté sa femme et ses enfants pour aller travailler à Toronto, mais chaque point de vue est si bien développé que son départ finit par nous paraître justifié". "

Awards
Portal received a Jutra Award nomination for Best Supporting Actress at the 14th Jutra Awards in 2012.

References

External links

2011 films
2011 comedy-drama films
Canadian comedy-drama films
Films shot in Montreal
Films set in Montreal
French-language Canadian films
2010s Canadian films